is a Japanese fictional character, the hero of a series of Japanese novels, films and TV programmes set in the Edo period (1603–1868) of Japanese history. He is a policeman (岡っ引き, okappiki) who catches criminals by throwing coins, the zeni of the title, thus Zenigata Heiji. The hero was created by novelist Kodō Nomura (野村胡堂, Nomura Kodō) in 1931. Heiji's beat is Myōjin-shita, "beneath the (Kanda) Myōjin shrine".

Situation
The hero, Heiji, lives with his wife Oshizu. His sidekick is Hachigorō (八五郎), also known as Karappachi or just Hachi. He uses deduction, a jutte, and old-fashioned coins with a hole, called kan'eitsūhō (寛永通宝), as weapons to catch criminals.
It's implied that "Zenigata" isn't his surname, but a nickname given to him.

Novels
The original series of stories ran from 1937 to 1959. The first story was published in the Japanese magazine Bungei Shunjū Ōru Yomimono-han (all story edition). In all, 383 stories were produced. Many are still in print in Japan today.

Historical accuracy
Zenigata Heiji is a fictional story, and is not based on any real individual. It is not made clear in which part of the Edo period the stories are set, although it's suggested that it takes place during the Enpō and Tenna eras.

The description of the okappiki in Zenigata Heiji differs from reality on several points. Okappiki were unpaid, or received a very small amount of money. Zenigata Heiji is depicted as a full-time policeman with no other job. In reality, this would have been impossible. Further, the "jutte" that Heiji usually carries was only issued to okappiki when the severity of an incident called for it.

In the TV series, Heiji carries his jutte in his belt; however, the jutte was actually carried in a pocket. The style of the jutte is also unrealistic.

Films 
Films about Zenigata Heiji include:
 銭形平次捕物控 振袖源太 (1931)
 七人の花嫁
 銭形平次捕物控 富籖政談 (1933)
 銭形平次捕物控 復讐鬼 (1933)
 銭形平次捕物控 紅蓮地獄 (1934)
 銭形平次捕物控 濡れた千両箱 (1935)
 銭形平次捕物控 (1939)
 銭形平次捕物控第二話 名月神田祭 (1939)
 銭形平次捕物控 平次の女難 (1939)
 銭形平次捕物控 南蛮秘法箋 (1940)
 銭形平次捕物控 平次八百八町 (1949)
 銭形平次 (1951)
 銭形平次捕物控 恋文道中 (1951)
 銭形平次捕物控 地獄の門 (1952)
 銭形平次捕物控 からくり屋敷 (1953)
 (天晴れ一番手柄 青春銭形平次 ... Seishun Zenigata Heiji) (1953)
 銭形平次捕物控 金色の狼 (1953)
 Zenigata Heiji: Ghost Lord (銭形平次捕物控　幽霊大名 Zenigata Heiji Torimono-Hikae: Yūrei Daimyō) (1954)
 銭形平次捕物控 どくろ駕籠 (1955)
 銭形平次捕物控 死美人風呂 (1956)
 Zenigata Heiji: Human-skin Spider (銭形平次捕物控　人肌蜘蛛 Zenigata Heiji Torimono no Hikae: Hitohada Gumo) (1956)
 (銭形平次捕物控 まだら蛇 Zenigata Heiji Torimono-Hikae: madara hebi) (1957)
 銭形平次捕物控 女狐屋敷 (1957)
 銭形平次捕物控 八人の花嫁 (1958)
 銭形平次捕物控 鬼火燈籠 (1958)
 銭形平次捕物控 雪女の足跡 (1958)
 銭形平次捕物控 美人蜘蛛 (1960)
 銭形平次捕物控 夜のえんま帖 (1961)
 銭形平次捕物控 美人鮫 (1961)
 銭形平次捕物控 (1963)
 銭形平次 (1967)

TV series
The lyrics of the ending theme of the TV show changed every week depending on the plot line. In the TV series, the closing credits show a coin, based on the kan'eitsūhō coin thrown by Heiji, with Zenigata Heiji written on it.

TV series about Zenigata Heiji include:

 銭形平次捕物控 Zenigata Heiji Torimono-Hikae (1958–1960) - 103 episodes
 銭形平次捕物控 Zenigata Heiji Torimono-Hikae (1962–1963) - 48 episodes
 銭形平次 Zenigata Heiji (Heiji, the Detective) (1966–1984) - 888 episodes. The longest-running Zenigata Heiji, Hashizo Okawa (大川橋蔵 Ōkawa Hashizō) made a total of 888 programmes, with several different co-stars, from 1966 until his death in 1984. Hashizō Ōgawa is recorded in the Guinness Book of Records as the longest running actor in a one-hour long television series for his performance as Heiji. (Hashizō Ōawa was originally an onnagata, an actor who plays women's parts in kabuki.) Sanae Tsuchida was in the cast from 1970 to 1973.
 銭形平次 Zenigata Heiji (1987) - 26 episodes
 銭形平次 Zenigata Heiji (1991–1997) Kin'ya Kitaōji played Heiji in the 1990s, and in 2005, a new cast features Hiroaki Murakami in the lead role.
 銭形平次 Zenigata Heiji (2004–2006)

References/Appearances in other media 

 In the manga/anime Lupin III, one of the supporting characters is Inspector Koichi Zenigata, who continually chases the protagonist Lupin. It is stated in the first episode of the first season that he is a descendant of Zenigata Heiji.
 Heiji appears in Monkey Punch's adaptation of the Time Agent stories.
 Zenigata Heiji is mentioned in the anime Ryusei no Rockman. 
 In the Final Fantasy series, the Zeninage skill (alternately translated as MoneyThrow, GP Toss, or Takeover) consists of throwing coins at the target for damage. The skill was introduced in Final Fantasy V as a technique of the Samurai job. Final Fantasy VI requires that the "Heiji's Jitte" item be equipped to unlock this ability.
 In the video game Sekiro the main character can throw coins at his enemies. Since the game is about Samurai, this is probably both a reference to Zenigata Heiji.
 Zenigata Heiji is highlighted in volume 8 of the Detective Conan manga's edition of "Gosho Aoyama's Mystery Library, a section of the graphic novels where the author introduces a different detective (or occasionally, a villain) from mystery literature, television, or other media. Heiji is also the given name of one of the series' major characters, Heiji Hattori.
 in Ken Akamatsu's Mahou Sensei Negima manga, Zenigata Heiji is referenced during the fight between Mana Tatsumiya and Ku Fei, when the former uses coins to attack the latter.
 in a chapter of Urusei Yatsura, Ataru remembers to be Heiji Zenigata upon picking up a jitte.

See also
Jidaigeki, Japanese period dramas
:ja:寛永通宝, the Japanese Wikipedia article on kan'eitsūhō gives images of the original coins.
Japanese mon (currency), the Japanese currency represented by the kan'eitsūhō.

References

External links 
  Films and TV series about Zenigata Heiji

Heiji, Zenigata
Literary characters introduced in 1931
Jidaigeki
Jidaigeki television series